Nancy Jean Sullivan is an American cell biologist researching filovirus immunology and vaccine development. She is a senior investigator and chief of the biodefense research section at the Vaccine Research Center. Her team discovered the monoclonal antibody, mAb114.

Education 
Sullivan completed a doctor of science from Harvard T.H. Chan School of Public Health in 1997. She conducted a dissertation in the laboratory of Joseph Sodroski, where her work demonstrated that primary HIV isolates exhibit resistance to antibody neutralization due to occlusion of the coreceptor binding site on gp120. Following her work on HIV, Sullivan pursued postdoctoral training under the guidance of Gary Nabel, studying the mechanisms of Ebola virus pathogenesis and immune protection.

Career 
Sullivan is a cell biologist. She is a tenured senior investigator and chief of the biodefense research section at the Vaccine Research Center.

Research 
Sullivan’s research is on the immunologic correlates and mechanisms of protection against infection by hemorrhagic fever viruses including Ebola virus. Her work on filovirus immunology and vaccine development is widely considered as one of the very best in the field despite the difficulties of conducting research under highly specialized BSL-4 containment conditions. Sullivan’s innovative and specialized work on filovirus immunology is recognized worldwide and has consistently been the source of novel observations that have contributed to critical advancements in the field.

Sullivan’s long-term commitment to Ebola research has resulted in discovery of both vaccines and therapies. By using a novel gene-based prime boost vaccine, Sullivan and her team were the first to demonstrate vaccine protection against Ebola infection in primates. This was followed by her discovery of a single shot vaccine that provided more immediate protection, making it a very practical vaccine that could be used in the face of an acute Ebola epidemic. As a result, this vaccination schedule is now standard in the field of Ebola vaccine research, where one of the lead Ebola vaccine candidates, ChAd3-EBOV, has been advanced to Phase I/II and III human clinical trials. More recently, Sullivan and her team discovered a potently protective monoclonal antibody, mAb114, from a human Ebola survivor that completely rescues Ebola-infected primates, even when given as a monotherapy several days after their Ebola exposure.

References 

Living people
Year of birth missing (living people)
Place of birth missing (living people)
National Institutes of Health people
21st-century American biologists
21st-century American women scientists
American medical researchers
Women medical researchers
Harvard School of Public Health alumni
American women biologists
Cell biologists